Esko Tommola (3 August 1930 – 7 April 2008) was a Finnish newsreader. He presented the MTV3's Ten News with Leena Kaskela between 1981 and 1995. He started his career in the 1960s working with public broadcasting and retired in 1995. 

He died on 7 April 2008.

References

1930 births
2008 deaths
Finnish television presenters